Buhalnița may refer to several places in Romania:

 Buhalnița, a village in Ceplenița Commune, Iași County
 Buhalnița, a village in Hangu Commune, Neamț County
 Buhalnița (Bahlui), a tributary of the Bahlui in Iași County
 Buhalnița, a tributary of the river Bistrița in Neamț County